The 2012 Campeonato Amapaense de Futebol was the 67th season of Amapá's top professional football league. The competition began on April 22 and ended on a decision made by the Tribunal de Justiça Desportiva do Amapá. Oratório was crowned champion.

Format
On the first stage, the eight teams play each other in a round-robin. The two best placed teams play the first stage final, and the six best teams advance to the second stage.

On the second stage, the six teams play each other in a round-robin again. The two best placed teams play the second stage final.

On the final stage, each stage winner faces each other. If the same team wins both stages, it is crowned champion.

Participating teams

First stage

Standings

Results

Final

Second stage

Standings

Results

Finals

References

Amapaense
Campeonato Amapaense